Days of Old Cheyenne is a 1943 American Western film directed by Elmer Clifton and starring Don 'Red' Barry, Lynn Merrick and William Haade.

The film's art direction is by Russell Kimball.

Cast
 Don 'Red' Barry as Clint Ross  
 Lynn Merrick as Nancy Carlyle  
 William Haade as Big Bill Harmon  
 Emmett Lynn as Tombstone Boggs  
 Herbert Rawlinson as Governor Frank Shelby 
 Charles Miller as John Carlyle  
 William Ruhl as Steve Brackett  
 Harry McKim as Bobby
 Bob Kortman as Slim Boyd 
 Nolan Leary as Higgins
 Kenne Duncan as Henchman Pete 
 Art Dillard as Henchman
 Duke Green as Henchman
 Eddie Parker as Poker Player  
 Bob Reeves as Townsman 
 Ken Terrell as Henchman

References

Bibliography
  Len D. Martin. The Republic Pictures Checklist: Features, Serials, Cartoons, Short Subjects and Training Films of Republic Pictures Corporation, 1935-1959. McFarland, 1998.

External links
 

1943 films
1943 Western (genre) films
1940s English-language films
American Western (genre) films
Films directed by Elmer Clifton
Republic Pictures films
American black-and-white films
1940s American films